Yuliia Pavlenko (born 9 August 1991) is a visually impaired Ukrainian Paralympic athlete. She represented Ukraine at the 2020 Summer Paralympics.

Career
Pavlenko represented Ukraine in the long jump T11 even at the 2020 Summer Paralympics and won a bronze medal.

References 

1991 births
Living people
People from Bakhmut
Ukrainian female long jumpers
Paralympic athletes of Ukraine
Paralympic bronze medalists for Ukraine
Paralympic athletes with a vision impairment
Paralympic medalists in athletics (track and field)
Athletes (track and field) at the 2020 Summer Paralympics
Medalists at the 2020 Summer Paralympics
Sportspeople from Donetsk Oblast
20th-century Ukrainian women
21st-century Ukrainian women